Eduardo Navarro Quelquejeu (born November 1, 1960), is a Panamanian artist, painter and sculptor.

Biography

Born and raised in Panama City, in 1981 Navarro obtained a B.S. in Mechanical Engineering in Worcester Polytechnic Institute and in 1985 an M.B.A. at The Amos Tuck School at Dartmouth College in Hanover, New Hampshire. Navarro is almost entirely self-taught, receiving no formal education in the visual arts.

His brother, Juan Carlos Navarro (politician) is the former Mayor of Panama City, who ran for President in 2014 Panamanian general election.

Works

In 2019 Navarro participated in the Residency Unlimited program in New York City, sponsored by the Rockefeller Brothers Fund.

References

Panamanian painters
Worcester Polytechnic Institute alumni
Dartmouth College alumni
1960 births
Living people